Peoples Westchester Savings Bank was a bank based in Hawthorne, New York.  On December 30, 1993, First Fidelity Bancorp acquired Peoples Westchester.  As of the date of acquisition, Peoples Westchester has 31 branches throughout Westchester County, New York.

History
July 21, 1853 - Chartered by New York State as Westchester County Savings Bank
April 30, 1971 - Acquired The Bank For Savings of Westchester
January 1, 1975 - Acquired Tuckahoe Savings and Loan Association
August 1, 1977 - Acquired Peoples Savings Bank of New York and renamed to Peoples Westchester County Savings Bank
March 1, 1978 - Renamed to Peoples Westchester Savings Bank
September 1, 1979 - Acquired Westchester County Savings and Loan Association
January 1, 1982 - Acquired Peekskill Savings Bank and Greenburgh Savings Bank
December 30, 1993 - Acquired by Federal First Fidelity Bank, N.A., New York

References

Banks based in New York (state)
Defunct banks of the United States
Banks established in 1853
1853 establishments in New York (state)
Banks disestablished in 1933
1933 disestablishments in New York (state)
American companies disestablished in 1933
American companies established in 1853